Engyprosopon is a genus of small lefteye flounders.

Species
There are currently 31 recognized species in this genus:
 Engyprosopon annulatus (M. C. W. Weber, 1913)
 Engyprosopon arenicola D. S. Jordan & Evermann, 1903 (Fringelip dwarf flounder)
 Engyprosopon bellonaensis Amaoka, Mihara & Rivaton, 1993 (Bellona flounder)
 Engyprosopon bleekeri (W. J. Macleay, 1881) (Bleeker's flounder)
 Engyprosopon filipennis H. W. Wu & S. F. Tang, 1935
 Engyprosopon grandisquama (Temminck & Schlegel, 1846) (Largescale flounder)
 Engyprosopon hawaiiensis D. S. Jordan & Evermann, 1903
 Engyprosopon hensleyi Amaoka & Imamura, 1990
 Engyprosopon hureaui Quéro & Golani, 1990 (Hureau's flounder)
 Engyprosopon kushimotoensis Amaoka, Kaga & Misaki, 2008
 Engyprosopon latifrons (Regan, 1908)
 Engyprosopon longipelvis Amaoka, 1969
 Engyprosopon longipterum Amaoka, Mihara & Rivaton, 1993 (Long pectoral fin flounder)
 Engyprosopon macrolepis (Regan, 1908)
 Engyprosopon maldivensis (Regan, 1908) (Olive wide-eyed flounder)
 Engyprosopon marquisensis Amaoka & Séret, 2005
 Engyprosopon mogkii (Bleeker, 1854)
 Engyprosopon mozambiquensis Hensley, 2003
 Engyprosopon multisquama Amaoka, 1963
 Engyprosopon natalensis Regan, 1920 (Natal flounder)
 Engyprosopon obliquioculatum (Fowler, 1934)
 Engyprosopon osculus (Amaoka & M. Arai, 1998)
 Engyprosopon praeteritus Whitley, 1950 
 Engyprosopon raoulensis Amaoka & Mihara, 1995
 Engyprosopon regani Hensley & Suzumoto, 1990 (Regan's flatfish)
 Engyprosopon rostratum Amaoka, Mihara & Rivaton, 1993 (Long snout flounder)
 Engyprosopon sechellensis (Regan, 1908)
 Engyprosopon septempes Amaoka, Mihara & Rivaton, 1993 (Seven pelvic ray flounder)
 Engyprosopon vanuatuensis Amaoka & Séret, 2005
 Engyprosopon xenandrus C. H. Gilbert, 1905
 Engyprosopon xystrias C. L. Hubbs, 1915

References

Bothidae
Marine fish genera
Taxa named by Albert Günther